Foreign relations exist between Australia and Thailand. Thailand is represented through its embassy in Canberra and a consulate general in Sydney.  Australia has an embassy in Bangkok.  Formal diplomatic relations were established between the two nations in 1952.

During the 2006 Thai coup d'état, Australian Foreign Minister Alexander Downer said, "it's of grave concern to us that the government has been overthrown in this way".

Trade

In 2003, the two countries announced they would enter into a free trade agreement. The Thailand-Australia Free Trade Agreement (TAFTA) entered into force on 1 January 2005. TAFTA has facilitated increased two-way trade and investment, improved business mobility, encouraged international best practice, and promoted bilateral cooperation in a range of areas including customs procedures, government procurement, competition policy and intellectual property protection.

As of 2015, the two-way trade in goods and services was worth more than A$20.8 billion.

Mineral exports 
Thailand is an important market for Australian aluminium and metal. Australia is also a significant supplier of coal to Thailand.

Tourism 
Thailand is a significant tourist market for Australians with 400,000 Australians visiting Thailand each year. The Australia-Thailand aviation market is Australia's 6th largest. A number of airlines provide direct flights between Australia and Thailand including: AirAsia, Jetstar, Thai Airways and Qantas.

See also 
 Australians in Thailand
 Thai Australian
 Foreign relations of Thailand
 Foreign relations of Australia

References

External links 
 Thailand-Australia Free Trade Agreement

 
Bilateral relations of Thailand
Thailand
Thai-Australian culture